Arthur Maulet (born July 13, 1993) is an American football cornerback for the Pittsburgh Steelers of the National Football League (NFL). He played college football at Memphis, and was signed by the New Orleans Saints as an undrafted free agent in 2017. He has also been a member of the Indianapolis Colts and New York Jets.

College career
As a senior at Memphis, Maulet played in all 13 games and recorded 73 tackles, 7.5 tackles for loss, 4.5 sacks, two interceptions, 15 passes defenced and two forced fumbles.

Professional career

New Orleans Saints
Maulet signed with the New Orleans Saints as an undrafted free agent on May 1, 2017. He was waived on September 2, 2017, and was signed to the Saints' practice squad the next day. He was promoted to the active roster on September 23, 2017, but was waived two days later and re-signed to the practice squad. He was promoted back to the active roster on December 2, 2017.

On September 21, 2018, Maulet was waived by the Saints.

Indianapolis Colts
On September 24, 2018, Maulet was claimed off waivers by the Indianapolis Colts. He was waived on November 20, 2018.

New Orleans Saints (second stint)
On November 26, 2018, Maulet was signed to the New Orleans Saints practice squad.

New York Jets
On January 29, 2019, Maulet signed a reserve/future contract with the New York Jets.
In Week 3 against the New England Patriots, Maulet recovered a fumble by punt returner Gunner Olszewski in the endzone for a touchdown as the Jets lost 30-14. He was waived on October 15 and re-signed to the practice squad. He was promoted to the active roster on October 30.

Maulet re-signed with the Jets on May 6, 2020. He was placed on injured reserve on September 22, 2020 with a groin injury. He was activated on October 31.

In Week 11 against the Los Angeles Chargers, Maulet recorded his first career sack on Justin Herbert during the 34–28 loss.

Pittsburgh Steelers
The Pittsburgh Steelers signed Maulet to a one-year contract on May 7, 2021.

On March 14, 2022, Maulet signed a two-year contract extension with the Steelers.

References

External links
Memphis Tigers bio
New Orleans Saints bio
New York Jets bio

1993 births
Living people
Players of American football from New Orleans
American football cornerbacks
Memphis Tigers football players
New Orleans Saints players
Indianapolis Colts players
New York Jets players
Pittsburgh Steelers players